"Restless Farewell" is a song by Bob Dylan, released as the final track on his third studio album The Times They Are a-Changin' in 1964. The melody is based on the Scottish folk song "The Parting Glass".

Notable performances

In 1995, Dylan performed the song live as part of the Sinatra: 80 Years My Way television special, celebrating entertainer Frank Sinatra's 80th birthday, at the request of Sinatra himself. It was the only performance in the special of a song that Sinatra had not recorded.

In 1968, Joan Baez covered it on her all-Dylan double album, Any Day Now.

De Dannan recorded it on their 1991 release Half Set in Harlem.

Robbie O'Connell performed the song as a member of Clancy, O'Connell, and Clancy on their 1997 self-titled album.

On the 2012 compilation album Chimes of Freedom: The Songs of Bob Dylan Honoring 50 Years of Amnesty International, the song was covered by Mark Knopfler.

See also
List of Bob Dylan songs based on earlier tunes

References

External links

Songs written by Bob Dylan
Bob Dylan songs
1964 songs
Song recordings produced by Tom Wilson (record producer)